Cristian Hîldan (born 22 September 1973 in Bucharest) is a former Romanian rugby union footballer and currently a rugby union coach. He was a member of the national team and also an unused substitute at the 1999 Rugby World Cup. He played as a wing.

Personal life
Cristian is the older brother of the late Cătălin Hîldan who was a professional football player who played for Dinamo and Romania national football team.

References

External links
ESPN.com profile

1973 births
Living people
Romanian rugby union players
Romanian rugby union coaches
Rugby union wings
Romania international rugby union players